Ateş is a Turkish word meaning "fire", and may refer to:

Given name
 Ateş Çınar (born 1986), Turkish yacht racer

Surname 
 Ceyda Ateş (born 1988), Turkish actress
 Levent Ateş (born 1991), Turkish middle-distance runner
 Necati Ateş (born 1980), Turkish football player
 Nejla Ateş (1932–2005), Turkish belly dancer
 Seyran Ateş (born 1963), German lawyer
 Toktamış Ateş (1944–2013), Turkish academic, political commentator and writer

Other uses
 Ateş (newspaper), a Turkish newspaper published from 1995 to 1999
 Ateş (album), a 2019 album by Turkish singer Demet Akalın

See also
 Ates, a given name and a surname

Turkish-language surnames
Turkish given names